Matilda Mary Hays (8 September 1820 – 3 July 1897) was a 19th-century English writer, journalist and part-time actress. With Elizabeth Ashurst, Hays translated several of George Sand's works into English. She co-founded the English Woman's Journal. Her love interests included the actress Charlotte Cushman, with whom she had a 10-year relationship, and the poet Adelaide Anne Procter.

Early life
Hays was born in London on 8 September 1820, the daughter of a corn merchant named John Hays and his wife Elizabeth Mary Atkinson. Elizabeth had previously been married to Jacob Breese until his death in February 1807, giving Matilda two elder half-sisters, Emma Marianne and Clara, who married Frederick Salmon in 1830. Matilda's full siblings were Elizabeth, Susanna and Albert.

Hays was identified as a Creole or, according to Joseph Parkes, half Creole. If this is true, it must be through her mother's side, as her father's family were Londoners going back at least three generations.

Career
She wrote articles for periodicals, often regarding women's issues, starting about 1838. The periodicals included The Mirror and Ainsworth's Magazine.

Hays, influenced by George Sand, was a journalist and novelist who was "determined to use her writing to improve the condition of women." In her novel Helen Stanley, Hays wrote that until "Women teach their daughters to respect themselves,... to work for their daily bread, rather than prostitute their persons and hearts" in marriages, women would not have secure financial and social futures.

George Sand translations
As George Sand's free love and independent lifestyle were unusual for a 19th-century woman, Hays and her friend Elizabeth Ashurst were "broad-minded" and intrigued by the political and social messages addressed in Sand's books. Hays had received support and encouragement from William Charles Macready and George Henry Lewes to translate Sand's novels into English. Both men wrote to Sand encouraging the arrangement and a friend of Hays, chaplain Edmund Larken, provided funding for the enterprise.

The initial translations of Sand's works were undertaken by Hays, Ashurst and, Larken. La Dernière Aldini, the first volume, was translated by Hays. Ashurst translated Les Maîtres mosaïstes and it was published in 1844. Hays's friend the Italian revolutionary Giuseppe Mazzini wrote a preface for Ashurt's translation of Lettres d'un voyageur. Sand, at Mazzini's urging, invited Ashurt to her home in Nohant. Olive Class reported that "Sand was unsettled by the superficial display of feminist rebellion exhibited by her as yet still unmarried disciple and characterized her as 'a prude without modesty.'"

George Henry Lewes suggested to Hays that the translation to the English language also toned down some of the rhetoric with an English cultural sensibility. Mazzini, aware of Lewes's suggestion to Hays, wrote to Sand, referring to Hays: "My friends and I consider it unthinkable that you would be willing to give such license to someone whose ideas are unknown to you."

Four volumes of Sand's work were translated by Hays and Ashurst and published, but they floundered. In attempting to tone down Sand's ideas, the translated books were "stripped it of its power," according to mazzini. The translations were "a smuggler's attempt to conceal the real nature of his infamous cargo," reported the Quarterly Review.

Both Hays and Ashurst also had poor financial rewards, due to the arrangement that they had made with a "bad business publisher." Ashurst and Hays worked to find publishers for their translated and edited versions of Sands' work.

Larken's work with Hays and Ashurst came to an end in 1847.

Hays translation of Fadette was published in 1851, separate from Ashurst.

Woman's journal

Early attempt
In 1847, Hays pursued creation of a Woman's journal, patterned after the American Godey's Lady's Book, to offer a vehicle for women writers and to provide a platform for discourse about women's rights, including better educational and occupational opportunities. Her goal was to afford "free discussion of a subject for which at that time it was impossible to obtain a hearing through ordinary channels of the Press." Charlotte Cushman and her friend, Mary Howitt, helped her explore opportunities to have the journal founded, but realized it was not quite the time to launch the journal and decided to focus her energy on advocacy for the present.

Eliza Cook's Journal
Shortly after Hays' unsuccessful attempt, poet Eliza Cook started a self-named journal and Hays was a journalistic contributor to the magazine. The journal was "a compendium of essays, poetry, reviews, and fiction that particularly addressed issues such as women's education, dress reform, temperance, and the plight of the working class and domestic servants.

English Woman's Journal
Hays was one of the co-founders and editor of the English Woman's Journal in 1858. It was in 1858 founded by Barbara Bodichon and Bessie Rayner Parkes, with others, Bodichon being the major shareholder.

The Society for Promoting the Employment of Women and the Victoria Press, which Hays helped found, met at the Langham Place offices of the journal. These premises had been obtained by her close friend Theodosia Blacker, Lady Monson for her. Monson also arranged for the offices and the reading room to be furnished and it became a de facto women's club offering meals, drinks, periodicals and newspapers. Morton became a director in 1860 and she helped with the administration. Monson also paid for the building to be re-furnished in 1863.

Hays had left the journal by 1864, reputedly because of her "difficult temperament." She had often disagreed with Parkes, her co-editor, about the journal's direction.

Acting
In 1848, there was a convergence of financial need, the "small fortune" Hays received was lost due to her father's depleted financial situation, and Charlotte Cushman's sister was leaving the stage, which created an acting opportunities. Charlotte's sister, Susan Webb Cushman, who played Juliet to Charlotte's Romeo, left the stage to marry a successful Liverpool scientist, James Sheridan Muspratt.

The women practiced together at the Yorkshire estate of the Duke of Devonshire for 6 October 1848 opening in Bath. Hays acted with Cushman for just a few months, as Cushman increasingly became a star.

Published works

George Sand translations
Ashurst translated the following books:
 Sand, George. (1842). Spiridion. Transl. Eliza A. Ashurst. Ed. by Matilda M. Hays. London: Churton.
 Sand, George. (1847). Letters of a Traveller. Transl. by Eliza A. Ashurst. Ed. by Matilda M. Hays. [Introduction by J. Mazzini]. London: Churton, 1847.
 Sand, George. (1847). The Works of George Sand. By Matilda M. Hays. [Translated by Matilda M. Hays, Eliza A. Ashurst, and E. R. Larken.].
 Sand, George. (1847). Andre'''. Transl. Eliza A. Ashurst, Ed. by Matilda M. Hays. London: Churton.
 Sand, George. (1851). Fadette. Transl. Matilda Hays.

Novels
 
 

Personal life
She had close personal relationships with Charlotte Cushman, Adelaide Anne Procter and Harriet Hosmer.

Charlotte Cushman
Hays and Charlotte Cushman met between 1846 and 1848. Soon after, they began a lesbian affair, a relationship they maintained for nearly 10 years, and in Europe were publicly known as a couple. Elizabeth Barrett Browning commented, "I understand that she (Cushman) and Miss Hays have made vows of celibacy and of eternal attachment to each other -- they live together, dress alike,... it is a female marriage." They wore tailored shirts and jackets. Matilda was often referred to by their friends as Mathew or Max.

In 1852, Cushman retired from the stage and joined Hays in Rome, Italy, where the lived in an American expatriate community, made up mostly of lesbian artists and sculptors. In 1854, Hays left Cushman for Harriet Hosmer, which launched a series of jealous interactions among the three women. Hays eventually returned to live with Cushman, but the tensions between her and Cushman would never be repaired. By late 1857, Cushman was secretly involved with Emma Stebbins. One night while Cushman was writing a note, Hays walked in, suspected that the note was to Stebbins, and demanded to see it. Cushman refused and Hays became mad and chased her round the house, hitting her with her fists. The relationship ended and Hays sued Cushman, claiming that she sacrificed her career to support Cushman's career. Cushman made a payment to Hays and their relationship ended.

Adelaide Anne Procter
Hays was believed to have had a love interest in Adelaide Anne Proctor, who dedicated Legends and Lyrics to her with:

She also wrote a love poem for Hays entitled, A Retrospect. Hays oversaw the tending of Procter's grave after her death and mourned her passing throughout her later years.

Theodosia Blacker, Lady Monson
Theodosia Blacker, Lady Monson (1803–1891) was a promoter of women's rights who rented 19 Langham Place as a homeplace for the Langham Place group, a circle of like-minded women who gathered there. She was the last companion of Hays.

Later years and death
Hays died in Liverpool at 15 Sefton Drive in Toxteth Park, on 3 July 1897. Although Adelaide Procter had died 30 years before Hays, the Liverpool Echo'' obituary stated that she had been "the dear friend of Adelaide Procter, gone before."

Notes

References

External links
 

19th-century British actresses
British stage actresses
British expatriates in Italy
British women journalists
19th-century English women writers
19th-century British novelists
British feminist writers
1820 births
1897 deaths
English women novelists
19th-century British journalists
19th-century translators
Lesbian feminists
19th-century British LGBT people